Chiromachla gracilis is a moth of the  family Erebidae. It is found in Madagascar.

References

Nyctemerina
Moths described in 1884